Palagummi (Telugu: పాలగుమ్మి) is one of the Indian surnames:
 Palagummi Padmaraju, Indian writer
 Palagummi Sainath, Indian development journalist

Indian surnames